Elwood Otto "Woody" Wagenhorst (June 3, 1863 – February 12, 1946) was an American football and baseball player and coach. In two career games, he had one hit in eight at-bats. Wagenhorst served as the head football coach at the University of Pennsylvania from 1888 to 1891, compiling a record of 39–18.

Biography
Wagenhorst was born in Gouldsboro, Pennsylvania in 1863. He played baseball and football while attending Princeton University (then known as the College of New Jersey). At the time of his graduation from Princeton, on June 8, 1888, he debuted at third base for the Philadelphia Quakers in the National League. After playing in only two games, Wagenhorst soon accepted an invitation to become coach of Penn's second paid football team, succeeding Frank Dole. For his coaching duties, Wagenhorst was paid $275.

In the fall of 1888 as Wagenhorst served the Penn football team as its coach, trainer and he even played end briefly that season. In 1889, while coaching at Penn, Wagenhorst enrolled in Law School. As a Penn law student, Wagenhorst also became third-baseman and captain of the school's 1890 and 1891 baseball teams.

After graduating in 1892, he became a private secretary for a Republican member of the U.S. House of Representatives from Pennsylvania and later Mayor of Philadelphia, John E. Reyburn. Wagenhorst later practiced law in Washington D. C. until his death in 1946.

Head coaching record

References

External links

1863 births
1946 deaths
19th-century baseball players
American football ends
Penn Quakers baseball players
Penn Quakers football coaches
Penn Quakers football players
Philadelphia Quakers players
Princeton Tigers baseball players
Princeton Tigers football players
Major League Baseball third basemen
Minneapolis Millers (baseball) players
St. Paul Apostles players
University of Pennsylvania Law School alumni
People from Wayne County, Pennsylvania
Players of American football from Pennsylvania
Baseball players from Pennsylvania